Kana Matayoshi (born 30 November 1994) is a Japanese professional footballer who plays as a midfielder for WE League club Chifure AS Elfen Saitama.

Club career 
Matayoshi made her WE League debut on 12 September 2021.

References 

Living people
1994 births
Japanese women's footballers
Women's association football midfielders
Association football people from Tokyo
Chifure AS Elfen Saitama players
WE League players